The Daily Telegraph Foursomes Tournament was a golf tournament played in England. The event was held annually from 1947 to 1951, and had total prize money of £2,100.

Detail
32 professionals and 32 leading amateurs were invited and drawn into pairs. Five rounds of foursomes knock-out were played with one round on the first day and two rounds on the second and third days.

Winners

References

Golf tournaments in England